Ratta may refer to:

 Ratta dynasty
 Rattas
 Ratta, Azad Kashmir
 Ratta, Punjab
 Ratta Matta
 Ratta Kulachi
 Raticate, a Pokémon species whose Japanese name is Ratta
 Ratta (YouTuber), a Sri Lankan YouTuber and actor Rathindu Senarathne